Peak-to-trough ratio (PTR), also known as peak-to-trough variation or peak-to-trough fluctuation, is a parameter in pharmacokinetics which is defined as the ratio of Cmax (peak) concentration and Cmin (trough) concentration over a dosing interval for a given drug. A drug with an elimination half-life of 24 hours taken once per day will have a peak-to-trough ratio of approximately 2. Peak-to-trough ratio is proportional to half-life and to dosing interval, with longer half-lives and shorter dosing intervals giving smaller ratios.

References

Pharmacokinetic metrics